The 1941 Idaho Vandals football team represented the University of Idaho in the 1941 college football season. The Vandals were led by first-year head coach Francis Schmidt, and were members of the Pacific Coast Conference. Home games were played on campus in Moscow at Neale Stadium, with one game in Boise at Public School Field.

Schmidt was hired at Idaho in March to succeed  head coach

Season
They did not play any of the four teams from California teams or Washington.

Idaho opened with a homecoming loss to Utah and then played Friday night road games in consecutive weeks, their first under the lights in nine years (last at UCLA in 1932). They split these two, both with the same score  losing at Oregon and winning at Gonzaga. Not known at the time, it was the last-ever game against Gonzaga, as the Bulldogs put their football program on hold after this season due to World War II and never resumed it. The teams had played nearly every year for three decades.

In the Battle of the Palouse with neighbor Washington State, the Vandals suffered a fourteenth straight loss, falling  at Rogers Field in Pullman on November 8. Idaho's most recent win in the series was a sixteen years earlier in 1925 and the next was thirteen years away, in 1954.

The next week, Idaho's losing streak to Montana in the Little Brown Stein rivalry was extended to a rare three years with a 16-point shutout at Moscow. While Montana was in the PCC (through 1949), the loser of the game was frequently last in the conference standings. The final game seven days later was also a shutout, a  victory over Montana State in Boise.

Schedule

 Two games were played on Friday night (Oregon at Eugene and Gonzaga at Spokane)

All-conference
No Vandals were named to the All-Coast team; back Bill Micklich was honorable mention.

References

External links
Gem of the Mountains: 1942 University of Idaho yearbook – 1941 football season
Go Mighty Vandals – 1941 football season
Official game program: Idaho at Washington State –  November 8, 1941
WSU Libraries: Game video – Idaho at Washington State – November 8, 1941
Idaho Argonaut – student newspaper – 1941 editions

Idaho
Idaho Vandals football seasons
Idaho Vandals football